Frans Bonduel (26 September 1907 – 25 February 1998) was a Belgian road bicycle racer.

Major results

1929
Criterium du Midi
Omloop van België
Wilrijk
1930
Mere
Paris — Lille
Tour of Flanders
Schaal Sels
Stekene
Wilrijk
Tour de France:
Winner stage 17
7th place overall classification
1931
Circuit du Morbihan
Lokeren
1932
Tour de France:
Winner stages 6 and 7
6th place overall classification
GP St-Michel
GP Stad Sint-Niklaas
1934
Paris–Brussels
1935
Landen
1936
Lochristi
Mons
Waregem
1937
Schaal Sels
1938
Ligny
Sint-Gillis-bij-Dendermonde
1939
Paris–Tours
Paris–Brussels

External links

Official Tour de France results for Frans Bonduel

1907 births
1998 deaths
Belgian male cyclists
Belgian Tour de France stage winners
People from Dendermonde
Cyclists from East Flanders
20th-century Belgian people